This is a list of German language names for places in Lower Silesian Voivodeship in south-west Poland. This region was part of Germany before 1945 (see History of Silesia).

See also 
List of German names for places in Poland

 G
Silesia Lower